NME, or New Musical Express, is a popular music magazine in the UK.

NME may also refer to:

Science and medicine
 N-Methylamide, a peptide C-terminal cap
 National Medical Enterprises, a former name of Tenet Healthcare
 Necrolytic migratory erythema, a symptom observed in patients with glucagonoma
 New molecular entity, in drug discovery
 Necrotizing meningoencephalitis, a disease of small-breed dogs

Other
 Enemy (eSports), often abbreviated NME, former professional eSports organization based in California
 National Military Establishment, a former name of the United States Department of Defense
 New Manufacturing Economy, a term used for "advanced manufacturing" in the "new economy"
 Nightmare Enterprises, a fictional monster delivery company in the anime Kirby: Right Back at Ya!
 Nissan Motorsport Europe, a British-based motorsport arm of Nissan Motors
 Non-market economics, study of the economy via mechanisms other than the market
 NME, IATA code for Nightmute Airport
 NME, an abbreviation for Australian hip-hop group No Money Enterprise
 NME (ensemble), London-based charitable organisation of creators and makers of contemporary new music and performance art